Plestiodon copei, also known commonly as Cope's skink, is a species of lizard in the family Scincidae. The species is endemic to Mexico.

Etymology
The specific name, copei, is in honor of Edward Drinker Cope, who was an American herpetologist and paleontologist.

Geographic range
Native to central Mexico, P. copei is found in the Distrito Federal and in the Mexican states of México, Michoacán, Morelos, Puebla and Veracruz.

Habitat
The preferred natural habitat of P. copei, is forest.

Reproduction
P. copei is viviparous.

References

Further reading
Schmitz A, Mausfeld P, Embert D (2004). "Molecular studies on the genus Eumeces Wiegmann, 1834: phylogenetic relationships and taxonomic implications". Hamadryad 28 (1–2): 73–89. (Plestiodon copei, new combination).
Smith HM, Taylor EH (1950). "An Annotated Checklist and Key to the Reptiles of Mexico Exclusive of the Snakes". Bulletin of the United States National Museum (199): 1–253. (Eumeces copei, p. 166).
Taylor EH (1933). "Two New Mexican Skinks of the Genus Eumeces ". Proceedings of the Biological Society of Washington 46: 129–138. (Eumeces copei, new species, pp. 133–136 + two drawings of head on p. 137).

copei
Reptiles of Mexico
Reptiles described in 1933
Taxa named by Edward Harrison Taylor